
Gmina Biskupiec is a rural gmina (administrative district) in Nowe Miasto County, Warmian-Masurian Voivodeship, in northern Poland.

The gmina contains part of the protected area called Brodnica Landscape Park.

Villages
Gmina Biskupiec contains the villages and settlements of Babalice, Bielice, Borki, Buczek, Czachówki, Fitowo, Gaj, Iwanki, Krotoszyny, Łąkorek, Łąkorz, Leszczyniak, Lipinki, Mała Wólka, Mec, Mierzyn, Osetno, Osówko, Ostrowite, Piotrowice, Piotrowice Małe, Podlasek, Podlasek Mały, Rywałdzik, Sędzice, Słupnica, Sumin, Szwarcenowo, Tymawa Wielka, Wąkop, Wardęgówko, Wardęgowo, Wielka Wólka, Wonna and Zawada.

Neighbouring gminas
Gmina Biskupiec is bordered by the gminas of Iława, Jabłonowo Pomorskie, Kisielice, Kurzętnik, Łasin, Nowe Miasto Lubawskie, Świecie nad Osą and Zbiczno.

References

Polish official population figures 2006

Biskupiec
Gmina Biskupiec